Sean D. Gauthier (born March 28, 1971) is a Canadian former ice hockey goaltender.

Career
Gauthier was drafted by the Winnipeg Jets in 1991. He played one game in the National Hockey League for the San Jose Sharks in the 1998–99 season, against the Chicago Blackhawks. The rest of his career, which lasted from 1991 to 2005, was spent in various minor leagues.

Personal
Gauthier lives in Arizona with his wife and three children. One of his sons, Cutter Gauthier, was selected 5th overall by the Philadelphia Flyers in the 2022 NHL Entry Draft.

Career statistics

See also
 List of players who played only one game in the NHL

External links

1971 births
Canadian expatriate ice hockey players in Sweden
Canadian ice hockey goaltenders
Fort Wayne Komets players
Ice hockey people from Ontario
Kentucky Thoroughblades players
Kingston Frontenacs players
Kingston Raiders players
Leksands IF players
Living people
Los Angeles Blades players
Louisiana IceGators (ECHL) players
Louisville Panthers players
Moncton Hawks players
Pensacola Ice Pilots players
Reading Royals players
Sacramento River Rats players
San Jose Sharks players
South Carolina Stingrays players
Sportspeople from Greater Sudbury
St. John's Maple Leafs players
Winnipeg Jets (1979–1996) draft picks